Mind Siege: The Battle for Truth in the New Millennium is a book written by David Noebel and Timothy LaHaye Making the case of what they view secular humanism to be. It was published in 2000.

Overview

The book's central thesis is the conspiracy theory that there are many groups — secret societies, liberal groups, etc. — working to "turn America into an amoral, humanist country, ripe for merger into a one-world socialist state."

The groups allegedly involved in the conspiracy include:

 The American Civil Liberties Union
 The National Association for the Advancement of Colored People
 The National Organization for Women
 The National Endowment for the Arts
 The National Association of Biology Teachers
 Planned Parenthood
 The "major TV networks, high-profile newspapers, and newsmagazines"
 The United States Department of State
 The major philanthropic foundations:
 The Rockefeller Foundation
 The Carnegie Foundation
 The Ford Foundation
 The World Council of Churches
 The National Council of Churches
 The United Nations
 UNESCO
 The "left wing of the Democratic Party"
 The Democratic Socialists of America
 Harvard
 Yale
 "2,000 other colleges and universities".

Contents
It Could Happen...
Introduction

Part One: The Conflict
1. You Incredible Brain, Your Magnificent Mind
2. The Wisdom of God
3. The Wisdom of Man

Part Two: The Situation
4. America's Christian Heritage
5. Secularizing America

Part Three: The Truth
6. The Humanist Bible
7. Humanism Is Unscientific
8. Humanism Is a Religion
9. Humanists Control America
10. The Big Lie

Part Four: The Challenge
11. The Pro-Moral Majority
12. Summer Soldiers and Sunshine Patriots
13. Waking the Sleeping Giant
14. What You Can Do
15. Time to Choose
Appendix A: Preliminary Questions for Political Candidates to Determine Their Position on Morals
Appendix B: Christianity and Science
Bibliography: Recommended Reading List
Notes

Books about conspiracy theories
Books critical of modern liberalism in the United States
2000 non-fiction books